Rayando El Sol is the ninth studio album by Puerto Rican singer-songwriter Manny Manuel, released by Universal Music on August 17, 2010. The album covers the songs by Mexican rock band, Maná.

Track listing

Charts

See also
List of number-one Billboard Tropical Albums of 2010

References

Manny Manuel albums
2010 albums
Universal Music Latino albums